Jesse L. James (born April 16, 1972) is an American law enforcement professional and Republican politician.  He is a member of the Wisconsin State Senate, representing the 23rd Senate district since January 2023.  He previously served two terms in the Wisconsin State Assembly, representing the 68th Assembly district. Before being elected to the Assembly, James was the police and fire chief of Altoona, Wisconsin.

Biography
Jesse James is a graduate of Chippewa Valley Technical College and served in the U.S. Army for six years. He lives in Altoona, Wisconsin, with his wife Vicki, with whom he has four children. He currently works as a police officer in the Village of Cadott, and is the only active-duty law enforcement officer serving in the Wisconsin Legislature. James and his wife own a small business.

During the 2021–2022 session, James was the Republican Caucus Secretary and chair of the Substance Abuse and Prevention Committee. He sat on the following Wisconsin Assembly committees: Children and Families, Corrections, Criminal Justice and Public Safety, Family Law (vice-chair), Mental Health, Small Business Development, and Veteran and Military Affairs.

He announced on January 21, 2022, that he was running for office for Wisconsin's 23rd Senate District. On August 9, 2022, James won the Republican primary with 50% of the vote and faced the general election unopposed.

During the 2023-2024 session, James was appointed as chair of the Senate Committee on Mental Health, Substance Abuse Prevention, and Children and Families. He also serves as vice-chair of the Senate Committee on Universities and Revenue, and as a member of the Joint Legislative Audit Committee and the Senate Committee on Judiciary and Public Safety.

James is a graduate of the Bowhay Institute for Legislative Leadership Development (BILLD) program. He is an appointee to the Wisconsin State Council on Alcohol and other Drug Abuse (SCAODA) and to the Wisconsin Council on Military and State Relations.

Legislation 
James has been the lead author on several bills that have been signed into Wisconsin law. Some of these include 2021 Assembly Bill 91 (relating to throwing or expelling a bodily substance at a public safety worker or prosecutor), Assembly Bill 92 (expanding psychiatric bed capacity in the Chippewa Valley), Assembly Bill 94 (allowing a pupil enrolled in a home-based private educational program to serve as an election inspector), Assembly Bill 155 (relating to inspections of recreational and educational camps), Assembly Bill 482 (grants to schools to provide critical incident mapping data to law enforcement agencies), and 2021 Wisconsin Act 197 (regarding the regulation of certain electric fences).

Rep. James was the lead author of a bipartisan bill legalizing fentanyl testing strips in Wisconsin, which was signed into law on March 16, 2022.

On March 17, 2022, Governor Evers signed 2021 Wisconsin Act 182 into law, a James-authored bill that allows a parent to change the last name of a child when the other parent has been convicted of certain heinous crimes such as homicide or certain sexual offenses. The bill, nicknamed "the 4 Bill" by James, was inspired by the wife and children of a school superintendent in James' district who was convicted of sexual crimes against a minor.

Rep. James also authored a bill making September 11, 2001, a formal observance day in Wisconsin schools (2021 Wisconsin Act 213).

References

External links

 
 Senator Jesse L. James at Wisconsin Legislature (2023)
 Representative Jesse L. James at Wisconsin Legislature (2021)
 Official website
 Campaign website

   

1972 births
Living people
Politicians from Eau Claire, Wisconsin
Republican Party members of the Wisconsin State Assembly
Republican Party Wisconsin state senators
21st-century American politicians
American municipal police chiefs